Arges, in Iran, may refer to:
 Arges-e Olya
 Arges-e Sofla